Noah Sete (born 7 April 1981) is an Australian former professional rugby league footballer who played as a  in the 2000s. He played for the South Sydney Rabbitohs in the NRL.

Playing career
Sete was a Mascot junior. In 2002, he joined the newly readmitted South Sydney Rabbitohs and became a regular member of their side in the lower grade competitions. He made his first grade debut from the bench in his side's 44-6 loss to the Melbourne Storm at the Olympic Park in round 15 of the 2002 season. His only other first grade appearance came in his side's 38-24 victory over the Wests Tigers at the Leichhardt Oval in round 18 of the 2002 season. He was released by South Sydney club at the end of the 2003 season and subsequently never played first grade rugby league again.

References

1981 births
Living people
Australian sportspeople of Samoan descent
Australian rugby league players
People from Newcastle, New South Wales
Rugby league props
Rugby league players from Sydney
South Sydney Rabbitohs players